The 2014  Japan Sevens was the continuation of the annual sporting event which was held on 22–23 March 2014. It was the third edition of the tournament and the sixth stop of the 2013–14 IRB Sevens World Series.

Format
The teams were drawn into four pools of four teams each. Each team played everyone in their pool one time. The top two teams from each pool advanced to the Cup/Plate brackets. The bottom two teams from each group went to the Bowl/Shield brackets.

Teams
The 16 participating teams are:

Pool Stage
The draw was made on 20 February 2014.

Pool A

Pool B

Pool C

Pool D

Knockout stage

Shield

Bowl

Plate

Cup

References

External links
Official Website

Japan Sevens
2013–14 in Japanese rugby union
Japan Sevens